The Logistic Regiment "Julia" is a military logistics regiment of the Italian Army based in Meran in South Tyrol. Today the regiment is the logistic unit of the Alpine Brigade "Julia" and shares with the brigade's infantry troops, the Alpini, the distinctive Cappello Alpino.

History 
On 15 September 1969 the IV Supply, Repairs, Recovery Battalion was formed in Bolzano as support unit of the 4th Alpine Army Corps. On 1 October 1981 the unit was renamed 4th Maneuver Logistic Battalion. On 1 September 1982 the 4th Army Corps Transport Group "Claudia" based in Eppan was merged into the battalion. During the army reform in 1986 the battalion was renamed 24th Maneuver Logistic Battalion "Dolomiti" on 1 November 1986. As per army naming convention for logistic units supporting corps-level commands the battalion was named after a geographic feature in the corps' area of operations; in case of the 24th battalion the Dolomites mountain range.

4th Army Corps Transport Group "Claudia" 

The 4th Army Corps Transport Group "Claudia" with its two transport battalions had been formed on 1 October 1976 during the 1975 army reform by reorganizing the IV Army Corps Transport Group, which in turn had been formed on 1 July 1961 in Eppan. Unlike the IV Supply, Repairs, Recovery Battalion the 4th Army Corps Transport Group "Claudia" was granted a new flag on 12 November 1976 by decree 846 of the President of the Italian Republic Giovanni Leone. As per army naming convention for transport units the group was named for a Roman road near its base; in case of the 4th transport group the Via Claudia Augusta. After the 4th Army Corps Transport Group "Claudia" had been merged into the 4th Maneuver Logistic Battalion the flag of the former was transferred to the Shrine of the Flags in the Vittoriano in Rome. On 22 May 1988 the 24th Maneuver Logistic Battalion "Dolomiti" received its own flag and subsequently its own coat of arms.

Logistic Battalion "Orobica" 

On 27 July 1991 the 4th Maneuver Logistic Battalion moved from Eppan to Meran, where it absorbed part of the disbanded Logistic Battalion "Orobica" of the Alpine Brigade "Orobica". The Logistic Battalion "Orobica" had been formed on 1 October 1956 as Services Unit "Orobica" in Merano and repeatedly changed composition and name until the 1975 army reform, when it became the Logistic Battalion "Orobica" and was granted a new flag on 12 November 1976 by decree 846 of the President of the Italian Republic Giovanni Leone. 

Initially consisting of a command platoon, two light logistic units, a medium logistic unit, and two medical units the battalion was reorganized on 1 November 1981 and consisted from then until being disbanded of the following units:

  Battalion Command, in Merano
 Command and Services Company
 Supply Company
 Medium Transport Company
 Maintenance Company
 Medical (Reserve) Unit

Afterwards the flag of the Logistic Battalion "Orobica" was transferred to the Shrine of the Flags in the Vittoriano in Rome.

Recent Times 
On 15 September 1994 the battalion incorporated the 41st Medical Company and 42nd (Reserve) Medical Company and was renamed 24th Maneuver Logistic Regiment "Dolomiti". On 1 February 2001 the regiment left the Alpine Troops Command and entered the Logistic Projection Brigade as 24th Alpine Maneuver Regiment. The regiment now consisted of a supply battalion, a maintenance battalion, and a medical battalion. In October 2013 the regiment was transferred to the Alpine Brigade "Julia" and on 1 January 2015 renamed Logistic Regiment "Julia".

Current structure 
Like all Italian Army brigade logistic units the Logistic Regiment "Julia" consists of:

  Regimental Command, in Merano
 Logistic Battalion "Dolomiti"
 Command
 Tactical Control Squad
 Supply Company
 Transport Company
 Maintenance Company
 Command and Logistic Support Company
 C3 Platoon
 Transport and Materiel Platoon
 Deployment Support Platoon
 Commissariat Platoon
 Garrison Support Unit

The Regimental Command consists of the Commandant's and Personnel Office, the Operations, Training and Information Office, the Logistic Office, and the Administration Office.

See also 
 Military logistics

External links
Italian Army Website: Reggimento Logistico "Julia"

References 

Logistic Regiments of Italy
Military units and formations established in 1994